Ophichthus ophis, the spotted snake eel, is an eel in the family Ophichthidae (worm/snake eels). It was described by Carl Linnaeus in 1758, originally under the genus Muraena. It is a marine, subtropical eel which is known from the western and eastern Atlantic Ocean, including Bermuda and southern Florida, USA, Brazil, Lesser Antilles, Senegal, Angola, and the Mediterranean.

The Spotted snake eel hunts nocturnally, and feeds primarily on octopuses and finfish, including Haemulon aurolineatum. It is used as bait in subsistence fisheries, but is reported to cause ciguatera poisoning, and therefore is not usually used as a food source.

References

External links
 

ophis
Fish described in 1758
Taxa named by Carl Linnaeus
Fish of the Atlantic Ocean